Julius Olavus Middelthun (3 July 1820 – 5 May 1886) was a Norwegian sculptor and educator. He is most associated with his busts and statues.<ref>Laurin, Hannover, Thiis, Scandinavian Art", Benjamin Blom, New York, 1968 p. 619-622</ref>

Biography
Middelthun was born at Kongsberg in Buskerud, Norway. He was the son of Georg Middelthun (1779–1831) and Maren Margrethe Jørgensen (1785–1829). His  father was employed at the Royal Norwegian Mint at Kongsberg. As a young man he trained as a goldsmith before moving to Copenhagen to study with Herman Wilhelm Bissen. His ten years there were followed by eight years in Rome (1851-6), after which he returned to Norway.

From 1869  until his death in 1886, Middlethun taught at the Royal Drawing School in Christiania (Tegneskolen i Kristiania) now the Norwegian National Academy of Craft and Art Industry in Oslo. Among his students were Erik Werenskiold (1883), Louis Moe and Theodor Kittelsen (1874), as well as Edvard Munch (1881) who painted the famous painting The Scream. 

Selected works
Bust of Henrik Wergeland, University Library, Oslo  (1861)
Bust of Johan Sebastian Welhaven, University Library, Oslo (1861)
Bust of Otto Thott Fritzner,   Trondheim Cathedral School (1862)
Bust of  Ole Jacob Broch,  National Gallery of Norway (1869)
 Bust of Jakob Aall, National Gallery of Norway (1871)
 Bronze bust of Halfdan Kjerulf, Halfdan Kjerulfs plass, Oslo (1874) 
 Statue of Anton Martin Schweigaard'', University Square, Oslo (1883)

References

1820 births
1886 deaths
People from Buskerud
Academic staff of the Oslo National Academy of the Arts
Norwegian sculptors
Norwegian educators
19th-century sculptors